Gomshavar (also - Gomshajur) is a former town in the current territory of the Tavush region of Armenia. Before 1950, Gomshavar was a small community engaged in forestry. In 1926, it had 17 inhabitants, while in 1970 it had 580 inhabitants.

References 

Populated places in Lori Province